The Department of Government Services is a part of the Government of New Brunswick.  It is charged with providing central services, including purchase of goods and services, provincial archives, corporate marketing services, translation and printing, to government departments and agencies. It also oversees the Crown agencies Service New Brunswick and the New Brunswick Internal Services Agency.

Part of the Department of Public Works and Highways until 1967, it was known as the Department of Public Works until 1972, and the Department of Supply and Services until 2012.  In 2012, its ceded responsibility for maintenance of government buildings to the Department of Transportation and Infrastructure and took on responsibility for corporate marketing for the government.

Ministers

External links
Department of Government Services

References 

 List of ministers and deputy ministers by department, New Brunswick Legislative Library  (pdf)

Government Services